Forbidden Love (Milování zakázáno) is a 1938 Czechoslovak comedy film, directed by Miroslav Cikán. It stars Helena Bušová, Frantisek Cerný, and Carl Lamac.

References

External links
Forbidden Love at the Internet Movie Database

1938 films
Czechoslovak comedy films
1938 comedy films
Films directed by Miroslav Cikán
Czechoslovak black-and-white films
1930s Czech films